Don Osvaldo is an Argentine rock band formed on November 2010, when Patricio Santos Fontanet changed the name of Callejeros, after their official separation on November 12.

The band was first called Casi Justicia Social, also known as CJS (by their initials, which abbreviated the name Callejeros). However, on September 29, 2014, it was announced that the group would change its name to the current one in homage to Osvaldo Pugliese.

History 
The new band debuted in the Club Banda Norte de Río Cuarto, Córdoba. Interpreting songs from his anterior musical group, Callejeros excepting four new songs.

Formation 
Late in 2010, after the dissolution of Callejeros by internal problems caused by the events happened in República Cromagnon and subsequents problems to the justice and victim's families, Patricio Santos Fontanet announced the formation of Casi Justicia Social with some ex-members. The new band gets CJS's initials, that sometimes identified Callejeros.

2010-Present 
After the new formation, CJS played concerts on different points from Argentina, playing songs from Callejeros and Casi Justicia Social's own songs like "O no", "Suerte", "Acordate" and "Tanto de todo".

Late in May 2012, after suspending shows programmed by June and July, they make public the notice that they will start with the pre-production of its first studio album.

References

External links 
 casijusticiasocial.com.ar, official web site integrated by Pato and Dios, bass player. (Spanish)
 El País: Se desarmó el grupo Callejeros (Spanish)
 Se disolvió el grupo “Callejeros” (Spanish)

Argentine rock music groups
Rock en Español music groups